The 1967 Idaho Vandals football team represented the University of Idaho in the 1967 NCAA College Division football season. The Vandals were led by third-year head coach Steve Musseau and played a third season in the Big Sky Conference. Two home games were played on campus at Neale Stadium in Moscow, with another in Boise at old Bronco Stadium at Boise Junior College.

After fullback Ray McDonald won the NCAA rushing title in 1966, the Vandals were involuntarily dropped by the NCAA to the College Division in 1967. After two seasons, Idaho returned to the University Division in 1969.

Although Musseau's  record was better than each of the previous eight head coaches, pressure from alumni and boosters forced his  despite a signed petition by the Vandal football players that he remain for a fourth year. He stayed with the university in 1968, but outside the athletic department in a fund-raising role under the university president.

Of the five assistant coaches, only first-year line coach Ed Troxel was retained for 1968. Formerly at Borah High School in Boise, he also coached track and became the Vandals' head track coach in May 1970. Troxel was an assistant coach in football at Idaho through 1973, then was the head coach for four seasons

Schedule

Roster

All-conference
Center Steve Ulrich was a repeat selection to the all-conference team, joined by tackle Jim Thiemens, running back Jim Pearsall, and cornerback Ken Dotson. Second team (honorable mention) picks were quarterback Steve Garman, wide receiver Jerry Hendren, and linebacker Roosevelt Owens.

NFL Draft
Two sophomores from the 1967 Vandals were selected in the 1970 NFL Draft, which lasted seventeen rounds (442 selections).

List of Idaho Vandals in the NFL Draft

References

External links
Gem of the Mountains: 1968 University of Idaho yearbook – 1967 football season
Go Mighty Vandals – 1967 football season
Official game program: Idaho at Washington State – November 11, 1967
Idaho Argonaut – student newspaper – 1967 editions

Idaho
Idaho Vandals football seasons
Idaho Vandals football